Sheridan Mountain is a mountain located in the Catskill Mountains of New York north-northwest of Phoenicia. Fork Ridge is located southwest, and Romer Mountain is located south of Sheridan Mountain.

References

Mountains of Ulster County, New York
Mountains of New York (state)